The A43 autoroute, also known as l'autoroute alpine and l'autoroute de la Maurienne, is a motorway in France. Travelling through the French Alps, the road connects the city of Lyon with the Tunnel du Fréjus, near Modane, which passes the Italian border towards Turin. The autoroute opened in phases as it was constructed between 1973 and 1998.

Characteristics
 2x2 lanes
 2x3 lanes between the Boulevard Périphérique in Lyon, the A46 and the A48 (34 km)
 2x4 lanes between the A46 and the A432 (7 km)
 4+3 lanes between the A432 and the toll barrier at Saint-Quentin-Fallavier (7 km)
 208 km long
 Service areas

History
 1973: Opening of the section between Lyon and Bourgoin-Jallieu.
 1974: Opening of the section between Bourgoin-Jallieu and Chambéry.
 1990: Widening of the road to 2x3 lanes between Saint-Quentin-Fallavier and the junction with the A48.
 1991: Opening of the L'Epine Tunnel.
 1991: Opening of section between Montmélian (A41) and Aiton. The section previously numbered A41 between Chambéry and Montmélian was re-numbered the A43.
 1996: Opening of section between Aiton and Saint-Jean-de-Maurienne.
 1998: Opening of section between Saint-Jean-de-Maurienne and Saint-Michel-de-Maurienne.
 2000: Opening of section between Saint-Michel-de-Maurienne and Freney, and the incorporation of the N566 approach to the Fréjus Tunnel.
 2002: Completion of Junction 11.
 2004: Completion of Junction 20.

Junctions
=

External links
 A43 autoroute in Saratlas

Autoroutes in France